The AAC SeaStar is an amphibious biplane that was produced in kitplane form. The aircraft is built largely of composite materials and features wings that may be easily removed for transport, and a ballistic recovery system in the form of a parachute that can be deployed from the engine nacelle.

AAC also marketed a Super Pétrel model in 2011.

This aircraft should not be confused with another composite-built small flying boat with the same name, the SeaStar Aircraft SeaStar.

Specifications (SeaStar)

See also

References

SeaStar
2000s Canadian civil utility aircraft
Amphibious aircraft
Single-engined pusher aircraft
Biplanes
Homebuilt aircraft
Flying boats